Stefan Kolev (born 11 October 1966) is a Bulgarian football manager and former footballer, who played as a defender and now is manager of Bulgaria U15. He is the only player to have won five A Group titles with four clubs – once with Levski Sofia, in 1988, once with CSKA Sofia, in 1992, once with Slavia Sofia, in 1996, and twice with Litex Lovech, in 1998 and 1999.

References

External links
Player Profile at LevskiSofia.info

1966 births
Living people
Bulgarian footballers
Association football defenders
PFC Akademik Svishtov players
PFC Levski Sofia players
PFC Spartak Varna players
FC Lokomotiv Gorna Oryahovitsa players
FC Yantra Gabrovo players
PFC CSKA Sofia players
PFC Slavia Sofia players
PFC Litex Lovech players
PFC Spartak Pleven players
First Professional Football League (Bulgaria) players
Bulgarian football managers